The vagrant darter (Sympetrum vulgatum) is a European dragonfly. The species takes its English name from its habit of occasionally appearing as a rare vagrant north of its normal range. However, it is likely to be under-recorded because it is very similar to the common darter (S. striolatum).

The species is common in central and northeast Europe. It breeds in standing water.

References

Fauna Europaea

Libellulidae
Dragonflies of Europe
Insects described in 1758
Taxa named by Carl Linnaeus